The Chicago blizzard of 1979 was a major blizzard that affected northern Illinois and northwest Indiana on January 13–14, 1979. The blizzard lasted for a total of 38 hours. Five people died during the blizzard, with approximately 15 others seriously injured due to conditions created by the storm. One of the five deaths came when a snowplow driver went berserk, hitting 34 cars and ramming a man.

O'Hare Airport was closed and all flights were grounded for 96 hours, from January 13 to 15. The cold weather and snowfall throughout the rest of January and February resulted in frozen tracks throughout the Chicago 'L' system. Consequently, commuters overwhelmed the capacity of CTA buses, causing bus commutes that normally would have taken 30 to 45 minutes to take up to several hours. To avoid huge snowdrifts in the streets, the overcrowded buses were obliged to take numerous detours, adding additional time to the commute.

After the storm 
Snow remained on the ground until March 6, a full fifty-one days. Deployment of plows was significantly delayed, and when they finally appeared they struggled to keep up with the snowfall. Much of the snow remained unmoved throughout the next two months, causing ongoing public transit delays and significant problems with trash collection. The city's inadequate response to the blizzard was blamed primarily on mayor Michael Bilandic, who had assumed the post after the 1976 death of Richard J. Daley. Newspaper articles at the time blasted Bilandic. Jane Byrne, Bilandic's main opposition in the Democratic primary, capitalized on this and defeated Bilandic in the February 27 primary, eventually becoming the first female mayor of Chicago.

See also
List of Regional Snowfall Index Category 4 winter storms

References

External links
The Chicago Blizzard of 1979
Chicago, Paralyzed in Sub-Zero Temperatures, Begins to Dig Out as Snow Continues The New York Times
News reports  at The Museum of Classic Chicago Television

1979-1
1979 meteorology
1979 natural disasters in the United States
1970s in Chicago
Natural disasters in Illinois
Natural disasters in Indiana
1979 in Illinois
1979 in Indiana
January 1979 events in the United States